Attfield is a surname. Notable people with the surname include:

George Attfield (1826–1925), English cricketer
Henry Attfield (1756–c. 1829), English cricketer
Jeremy Attfield (born 1972), English cricketer
Paul Attfield (born 1962), British academic
Robin Attfield, British academic
Roger Attfield (born 1939), Canadian thoroughbred trainer
William Attfield (1823–1876), English cricketer